Alexander Borisovich Mayer, born 18 February 1986) is a professional Russian ice hockey left winger playing for Buran Voronezh.

References

External links

1986 births
Kapitan Stupino players
Kazzinc-Torpedo players
Living people
Metallurg Novokuznetsk players
Sportspeople from Irkutsk
Russian ice hockey left wingers
Yertis Pavlodar players